Andrew "Andy" Mason (born 10 November 1962), also known by the nickname of "Mase", is an English former rugby union and professional rugby league footballer who played in the 1980s and 1990s.

Background
Andy Mason was raised in Leek Street Flats, Leeds, West Riding of Yorkshire, England.

Playing career

International honours
Andy Mason won caps for England (Schools 19 group) (RU), and was selected as the 18th man (interchange//substitute to travel, Garry Schofield and Ellery Hanley were the s during the match) for Great Britain (RL) in the 16-38 defeat by Australia in the 1986 Kangaroo tour of Great Britain and France test match at Old Trafford, Manchester on Saturday 25 October 1986.

County honours
Andy Mason won caps for Yorkshire (RU) while at Roundhay RFC/Morley R.F.C., and he won caps for Yorkshire (RL) while at Bramley and Wakefield Trinity.

County Cup Final appearances
Andy Mason played right-, i.e. number 3 and scored a try in Wakefield Trinity's 8–11 defeat by Castleford in the 1990–91 Yorkshire County Cup Final during the 1990–91 season at Elland Road, Leeds on Sunday 23 September 1990, and played right-, i.e. number 3, and scored a try in the 29–16 victory over Sheffield Eagles in the 1992–93 Yorkshire County Cup Final during the 1992–93 season at Elland Road, Leeds on Sunday 18 October 1992.

Club career
Andrew Mason changed rugby football codes from rugby union to rugby league when he transferred to Bramley, he made his debut for Bramley playing right- in the 12-19 defeat by Batley at Mount Pleasant, Batley on Sunday 3 February 1985, he scored his first try for Bramley playing  in the 16-19 defeat by Dewsbury at McLaren Field, Bramley, he scored a hat-trick of tries in the 32-4 victory over Whitehaven at McLaren Field, Bramley, he scored his last try (2-tries) for Bramley in the 20-15 victory over Blackpool Borough at McLaren Field, Bramley, and he played his last match for Bramley in the 46-20 victory over Mansfield Marksman at McLaren Field, Bramley on Friday 18 April 1986, he transferred from Bramley to Leeds. In August 1987, the Leeds players; Mark Conway, Philip Fox, Andy Mason, and Keith Rayne, were transferred in exchange for the Wakefield Trinity players; John Lyons, and Gary Spencer.

References

External links
Wakefield Trinity V Australia 1990
(archived by web.archive.org) Wakefield Trinity Wildcats – Andy Wilson interview!
Bramley Legends - Andy Mason

1962 births
Living people
Bramley RLFC players
English rugby league players
English rugby union players
Leeds Tykes players
Leeds Rhinos players
Morley R.F.C. players
Rugby league centres
Rugby league players from Leeds
Rugby union players from Leeds
Wakefield Trinity players
Yorkshire County RFU players
Yorkshire rugby league team players